George Henry "K.O." Chaney (April 16, 1892 – December 20, 1958) was a hard punching featherweight and lightweight who fought from 1910 to 1928. Known as the "Knockout King of Fistiana",  Chaney was born in Baltimore, Maryland, to Irish-American parents. Boxing Illustrated ranked him #4 all-time in terms of pound for pound punchers, while the Bleacher Report named him the #14 greatest southpaw in boxing history. He was inducted into the International Boxing Hall of Fame in 2014.

Professional career
Chaney, despite being a terrific puncher, was afflicted with a glass jaw which often was his downfall against top ranked opponents.  Nevertheless, he fought many of the top lightweights and featherweights from his era, including Johnny Dundee, Rocky Kansas, Lew Tendler and Abe Attell. Chaney was selected for the Ring Magazine's list of 100 greatest punchers of all time.

Chaney was afforded two opportunities to win a world title. On September 4, 1916, he challenged world featherweight champion Johnny Kilbane for his crown.  Kilbane KO'd Chaney in round 3. His last title opportunity came when he sought to capture the newly created world junior lightweight title on November 18, 1921.  Chaney met Johnny Dundee for the championship, but lost when he was disqualified  in the fifth round.

His bout with Rocky Kansas at old Oriole Park in 1920 was judged the most brutal and bloody bout ever held in Baltimore.

Professional boxing record
All information in this section is derived from BoxRec, unless otherwise stated.

Official record

All newspaper decisions are officially regarded as “no decision” bouts and are not counted in the win/loss/draw column.

Unofficial record

Record with the inclusion of newspaper decisions in the win/loss/draw column.

References

External links
 

1892 births
1958 deaths
Boxers from Maryland
Featherweight boxers
Lightweight boxers
American male boxers